James Thomas Smith (born 28 October 1988), known professionally as Jamie xx, is an English musician, DJ, record producer and remixer. He is known for both his solo work and as a member of the English indie pop band The xx.

He has been described as a "driving force" behind The xx, contributing to the group's significant commercial and critical success. As a solo artist, he has been recognised with a 2015 Mercury Prize nomination, and a 2016 Grammy Award for Best Dance/Electronic Album nomination for his sophomore album In Colour.

Career

2005–2009
Smith's musical career began in 2005 when he joined The xx accompanying old schoolmates Romy Madley Croft, Oliver Sim and Baria Qureshi of the Elliott School in London, notable for alumni including Hot Chip, Burial and Four Tet. He first used the stage name Jamie xx in July 2009 in a promotional mix for the band's debut album xx released on the FACT magazine mix series. The mixtape was compiled by Jamie Smith and featured, amongst others, four tracks credited to Jamie xx – one self-production and three remixes. The xx album went on to become platinum in the UK. Afterward, Jamie Smith went on to do more remix work for artists like Florence + The Machine, Adele, Jack Peñate and Glasser.

2010–present
In late 2010, a Jamie xx remix of the song "NY Is Killing Me" from Gil Scott-Heron's last album I'm New Here aired on radio stations across the UK and Europe. The remix of "I'll Take Care of U" followed in January 2011. Both singles drew the attention of the general public and the critics. They set the way for a 13-track remix album entitled We're New Here, produced entirely by Jamie xx and credited to "Gil Scott-Heron and Jamie xx". The album was released on 21 February 2011 on the XL Recordings label, but a full-album preview could be streamed on the website of The Guardian as early as 14 February. We're New Here received critical acclaim and was named "a cohesive, considered masterpiece in its own right" by BBC's Ele Beattie.

On 6 June 2011 the two-track self-produced single "Far Nearer / Beat For" was released. The song "Far Nearer" was selected Best New Track by Pitchfork, and the double A-side single charted at number 128 on the UK Singles Chart. Later the same year, Smith produced the title track off Drake's second album, Take Care, which features Rihanna. In addition, Smith helped create several reworks for Radiohead's song "Bloom" which were released on a remix album entitled TKOL RMX 1234567. He also co-produced the song "When It's All Over" with Alicia Keys on her Girl on Fire album. In 2014, he announced an upcoming collaboration with John Talabot on Tim Sweeney's Beats in Space online radio show. In 2014 he released the singles "Girl/Sleep Sound" and "All Under One Roof Raving".

On 27 March 2015 he released two singles. "Loud Places", featuring the xx's Romy Madley Croft, and "Gosh". On the same day he also announced that his debut album, In Colour, would be out on 1 June 2015. Ahead of its release, In Colour was streamed on iTunes as a preview with album-spanning visuals that 'reacted' to each sound.

Jamie xx composed the score for a ballet, Tree of Codes, commissioned by Manchester International Festival for its 2015 edition. Based on a novel of the same name by Jonathan Safran Foer, the ballet was choreographed by Wayne McGregor and had a set created by Olafur Eliasson.

In 2020, he released his first single in 5 years, "Idontknow", which received positive to lukewarm reception from critics. He was credited on Tyler, The Creator's 2021 album Call Me If You Get Lost as a co-producer on the track "RISE!".

In 2022, Jamie xx was enlisted to produce fellow bandmate Oliver Sim's debut album, Hideous Bastard.

Discography

Studio albums

Singles

Other charting songs

Other tracks
{| class="wikitable"
|-
!  style="text-align:center; width:35px;"|Year
!Title
!Date
!Info
|-
| style="text-align:center;"  rowspan="2"|2011
|"Progress"
|style="text-align:center;"|7 October 2011
|RizLab Permance live
|-
|"Touch Me" |style="text-align:center;"|20 February 2011
|Jamie XX mix on BBC 6 Music
|-
| style="text-align:center;"|2012
|"Touch Me" 
|style="text-align:center;"|31 January 2012
|Young Turks Takeover on FBi Radio
|-
| style="text-align:center;"  rowspan="2"|2014
|"Continuum" 
|style="text-align:center;" rowspan="2"|22 November 2014
|rowspan="2"|Continuum (Soundtrack)
|-
|"Sunrise"
|-
| style="text-align:center;"|2016
|"Oh Gosh" 
|style="text-align:center;"|13 May 2016
|Vocal version of "Gosh"
|-
| style="text-align:center;"|2020
|"Idontpiano"
|25 April 2020
|Piano version of "Idontknow"
|}

Remixes

Awards and nominations
{| class=wikitable
|-
! Year !! Awards !! Work !! Category !! Result
|-
| rowspan=2|2011
| BT Digital Music Awards
| Gil Scott-Heron & Jamie xx: Album Transmitter
| Best Artist Promotion
| 
|-
| Rober Awards Music Prize
| Gil Scott-Heron & Jamie xx
| Best Soul/R&B
| 
|-
| 2012
| rowspan=2|The Music Producers Guild Awards
| rowspan=2|Himself
| rowspan=2|Remixer of the Year
| 
|-
|2013
| 
|-
| 2014
| rowspan=2|Q Awards
| "Sleep Sound"
| Best Video
| 
|-
| rowspan=9|2015
| rowspan=2|In Colour| rowspan=2|Best Album
| 
|-
| MOBO Awards
| 
|-
| rowspan=4|Rober Awards Music Poll
| rowspan=2|Himself
| Best Male Artist 
| 
|-
| Best Electronica 
| 
|-
| rowspan=2| "I Know There's Gonna Be (Good Times)"
| Song of the Year 
| 
|-
| Floorfiller of the Year 
| 
|-
| AIM Independent Music Awards
| "Loud Places"
| Independent Video of the Year
| 
|-
| International Dance Music Awards
| Himself
| Best Indie Dance/Underground DJ
| 
|-
| Mercury Prize
| rowspan=5|In Colour''
| Album of the Year 
| 
|-
| rowspan=14|2016
| Grammy Awards
| Best Dance/Electronic Album
| 
|-
| Ivor Novello Awards
| Album Award
| 
|-
| Elle Style Awards
| Album of the Year
| 
|-
| rowspan=2|Brit Awards
| British Album of the Year
| 
|-
| rowspan=2|Himself
| British Male Solo Artist
| 
|-
| rowspan=2|International Dance Music Awards
| Best Indie Dance/Underground DJ
| 
|-
| "Loud Places"
| Best Alternative/Indie Rock Dance Track 
| 
|-
| rowspan="5" | UK Music Video Awards
| rowspan="15" | "Gosh"
| Video of the Year
| 
|-
| Best Alternative Video - UK 
| 
|-
| Best Color Grade 
| 
|-
| Best Styling 
| 
|-
| Best Cinematography
| 
|-
| Camerimage
| Best Music Video 
| 
|-
| Rober Awards Music Poll
| Best Promo Video 
| 
|-
| rowspan=8|2017
| Berlin Music Video Awards
| Best Cinematography
| 
|-
| rowspan=3|Cannes Lions International Festival of Creativity
| Gold Lion for Cinematography
| 
|-
| Silver Lion for Production Design / Art Direction 
| 
|-
| Silver Lion for Direction
| 
|-
| rowspan=3|D&AD Awards
| Best Music Video
| style="background:#ffbf00; text-align: center;"| Yellow Pencil
|-
| Best Direction
| style="background:#8a8b89; color: white; text-align: center;"| Graphite Pencil
|-
| Best Cinematography
| style="background:#8a8b89; color: white; text-align: center;"| Graphite Pencil
|-
| Grammy Awards
| Best Music Video
| 
|-

Notes

References

1988 births
21st-century English musicians
English DJs
English electronic musicians
English male musicians
English record producers
Living people
Place of birth missing (living people)
Post-dubstep musicians
Future garage musicians
Remixers
UK garage musicians
XL Recordings artists
Electronic dance music DJs
21st-century British male musicians